Exponential Random Graph Models (ERGMs) are a family of statistical models for analyzing data from social and other networks. Examples of networks examined using ERGM include knowledge networks, organizational networks, colleague networks, social media networks, networks of scientific development, and others.

Background
Many metrics exist to describe the structural features of an observed network such as the density, centrality, or assortativity. However, these metrics describe the observed network which is only one instance of a large number of possible alternative networks. This set of alternative networks may have similar or dissimilar structural features. To support statistical inference on the processes influencing the formation of network structure, a statistical model should consider the set of all possible alternative networks weighted on their similarity to an observed network. However because network data is inherently relational, it violates the assumptions of independence and identical distribution of standard statistical models like linear regression. Alternative statistical models should reflect the uncertainty associated with a given observation, permit inference about the relative frequency about network substructures of theoretical interest, disambiguating the influence of confounding processes, efficiently representing complex structures, and linking local-level processes to global-level properties. Degree-preserving randomization, for example, is a specific way in which an observed network could be considered in terms of multiple alternative networks.

Definition
The Exponential family is a broad family of models for covering many types of data, not just networks. An ERGM is a model from this family which describes networks.

Formally a random graph  consists of a set of  nodes and  dyads (edges)  where  if the nodes  are connected and  otherwise.

The basic assumption of these models is that the structure in an observed graph  can be explained by a given vector of sufficient statistics  which are a function of the observed network and, in some cases, nodal attributes. This way, it is possible to describe any kind of dependence between the undyadic variables:

These models represent a probability distribution on each possible network on  nodes. Because the number of possible networks in the set vastly outnumbers the number of parameters which can constrain the model, the ideal probability distribution is the one which maximizes the Gibbs entropy.

References

Further reading

Harris, Jenine K (2014). An introduction to exponential random graph modeling. Sage.

Network theory